Predator: Hunting Grounds is a multiplayer video game developed by IllFonic and published by Sony Interactive Entertainment for PlayStation 4 and Windows. It is part of the Predator franchise, featuring Arnold Schwarzenegger reprising his role as Alan "Dutch" Schafer (Predator), Alice Braga reprising her role as Isabelle (Predators), and Jake Busey reprising his role as Sean Keyes (The Predator).

Set in the remote jungles of the world, it tasks a team of four elite operatives with completing paramilitary operations before a single Predator can find and eliminate them. The game was released on April 24, 2020.

Predator: Hunting Grounds was the first Predator video game in a decade, following the Predators-themed mobile games from Angry Mob and Gameloft released in 2010, and the first full title for consoles since 2005's Predator: Concrete Jungle (although several other games featuring the Yautja were released in the interim).

Gameplay
Predator: Hunting Grounds is an asymmetrical multiplayer video game taking place in remote jungle locations. One player controls the Predator, while 4 others play as a team of special operations operators known as "Fireteam Voodoo" on a mission to collect intel or eliminate a drug lord until being forced to fight the Predator. The chief element is to either avoid being hunted by the Predator or capture and kill the Predator who in turn will be controlled by the player.

Objectives for Fireteam Voodoo include neutralizing computer-controlled NPC enemies, sabotaging their shipments and retrieving important VIP targets from them, as well as other special tasks. The game's maps offer various tactical opportunities for Fireteam players, from working together as a cohesive unit to splitting their force to reach their objectives. While this element of the game plays out, another player takes control of the Predator and tries to wipe out all of the special forces team members. If the human players manage to kill the Predator, their operation will be taken over by the Other Worldly Life Forms Program (OWLF) and they will be instructed to guard the body against hostiles until they can be extracted.

For the first time in a Predator game, players have the option of playing as a female Yautja.

The game includes a lootcrate system known a "Field Lockers", which are unlocked during gameplay and grant various appearance and weapon customization options for both Fireteam and Predator characters, including the flintlock pistol of Raphael Adolini. Field Lockers are randomized and can contain duplicate items, in which case the duplicate item will be converted to additional XP. As well as being a reward for increasing in rank, Field Lockers can also be purchased, either using "Veritanium", a form of in-game currency that can be earned through gameplay or found hidden within the game map. Items may also be purchased directly for Veritanium, although some of the rarer items can be many times more expensive than a single Field Locker.

Development
Predator: Hunting Grounds was announced at the State of Play presentation in May 2019. It was noted that the game will allow cross-play between PlayStation 4 and Windows. The beta version of the game was released on 27 March 2020 which was available until 29 March, with the full game released on 24 April 2020.

Reception

Predator: Hunting Grounds received "mixed or average" reviews, according to review aggregator Metacritic.

Tomas Franzese of Inverse reviewed the beta calling it the "worst Sony game of this generation", that the "game feels like a mess", visually outdated and unpolished. Jonathon Dornbush of IGN, who also played the trial weekend, noted the excessive wait times to get in to a game and said he hopes that IllFonic "can find a better balance to making the other objectives a bit more interesting".

The PlayStation 4 version of Predator: Hunting Grounds was the tenth-bestselling retail game during its first week of release in Japan, selling 9,172 copies.

References

External links
 

2020 video games
Asymmetrical multiplayer video games
First-person shooters
Multiplayer video games
PlayStation 4 games
Predator (franchise) games
Science fiction video games
Sony Interactive Entertainment games
Video games developed in the United States
Video games set in South America
Video games with cross-platform play
Windows games
Unreal Engine games
IllFonic games